Wallace Albertyn (born 26 May 1981) is a South African cricketer. He played in 23 first-class and 30 List A matches for Boland from 2001 to 2006.

See also
 List of Boland representative cricketers

References

External links
 

1981 births
Living people
South African cricketers
Boland cricketers
Cape Cobras cricketers
People from Alberton, Gauteng